Peter Giunta (born August 11, 1956) is an American football coach who is the senior defensive assistant for the New Orleans Saints of the National Football League (NFL). He served as defensive backs coach to defensive coordinator Perry Fewell and head coach Tom Coughlin for the New York Giants from 2006 to 2014. Giunta has also served as defensive coordinator for the St. Louis Rams from 1998 to 2000, succeeding the retiring Bud Carson. Giunta has coached at the high school, college, and professional level, and also as both offensive and defensive assistant throughout his career. He played cornerback and running back under Robert Lyons at Northeastern University from 1974 to 1977.

References

External links
 New Orleans Saints profile

1956 births
Living people
American football cornerbacks
American football running backs
Brown Bears football coaches
Kansas City Chiefs coaches
Lehigh Mountain Hawks football coaches
New Orleans Saints coaches
New York Giants coaches
New York Jets coaches
Northeastern Huskies football players
Penn State Nittany Lions football coaches
Philadelphia Eagles coaches
St. Louis Rams coaches
Sportspeople from Salem, Massachusetts
High school football coaches in Massachusetts
Players of American football from Massachusetts